Maysky is a rural locality (a selo) and the administrative centre of Maysky Selsoviet, Iglinsky District, Bashkortostan, Russia. The population was 356 as of 2010. There are 3 streets.

Geography 
Maysky is located 54 km east of Iglino (the district's administrative centre) by road. Rasmikeyevo is the nearest rural locality.

References 

Rural localities in Iglinsky District